Anna Beek née Anna van Westerstee (25 November 1657, The Hague - after October 1717, The Hague), was a Dutch publisher of maps.

Career 
Most of the maps she produced are city and battle plans, which are mapping naval and ground troop movements. The War of the Spanish Succession began in 1701 and the majority of the maps she sold were of key moments, providing news of events in real time. She married the publisher and art dealer Barent Beek in 1678, but after a 15-year marriage and having seven children together, her spouse deserted her. She later divorced him and the local courts supported her running the family business. Since at least 1697 she often used her maiden name "Van Westerstee" again. Several reference books consider her the engraver of some of the works she published.

Thirty maps produced by Beek are part of the Geography and Map Division's collection at the U.S. Library of Congress.

See also
 List of women printers and publishers before 1800

References

1657 births
1710s deaths 
17th-century Dutch cartographers
Dutch engravers
Dutch publishers (people)
Businesspeople from The Hague
Women cartographers
17th-century publishers (people)